Alpine Club maps (often abbreviated to AV-Karten i.e. AV maps) are specially detailed maps for summer and winter mountain climbers (mountaineers, hikers and ski tourers). They are predominantly published at a scale of 1:25.000, although some individual sheets have scales of 1:50.000 and 1:100.000.

The cartographic library of the German (DAV) and Austrian Alpine Clubs (OeAV) currently has about 70 different high mountain maps. Also, individual map sheets of the Alpine region or other interesting mountain areas in the world are continually being published. The publication of its maps has been a function of the Alpine Club since 1865.

The reason the two clubs still issue their maps is to complement the range of more or less good official maps of the high mountains with special large-scale maps. This is especially true for the Austrian Alpine region, which is the classical field for Alpine Club branches (sections). Here, there are no official maps at a scale of 1: 25.000, so the Alpine Club fills an important gap in the maps available.

Characteristics 
The characteristics of AV maps are their large scale (usually 1:25,000), high accuracy, and a great wealth of terrain detail in the high mountains (rock, rubble, glaciers, etc.). The contour interval is a maximum of 20 metres. The mountaineer should therefore be able to orient himself well using Alpine Club maps, both on the marked trails or in open terrain, i.e. away from the marked routes. In addition, the map sheets are divided in a way suitable for climbers and hikers with overlapping map sheets and a focus on the high mountain regions. Map names and height information (spot heights) are more densely printed than in other comparable maps.

References

External links 

 Overview of the cartography and AV maps at DAV and at OeAV
Map types
Works about mountaineering